Lieutenant-General Eulogio Pantaleón Villegas y Soldi (July 27, 1873 – April 8, 1898), better known by his nom-de-guerre León Kilat (literally "Lightning Lion" in Cebuano), was a Filipino revolutionary leader in Cebu during the Philippine Revolution against the Spanish Empire. He was born in Bacong, Negros Oriental, to Policarpio Villegas Vergara and Úrsula Soldi. His grandparents were Pedro Villegas, and Dorotea Vergara, the daughter of a Vallehermoso capitán.

Biography

Occupation 

In 1895, Villegas worked at the Botica Antigua located in the corner of Calle del Palacio (today Burgos St.) and Calle Legazpi. It was a well-known drugstore frequented by many townsfolk. With him were Ciriaco Murillo and Eulogio Duque who told the writer Manuel Enríquez de la Calzada that Villegas actually used the name "Eulogio", instead of Pantaleón. Because there were two Eulogios working in the drugstore, the  owner decided to call him "León" instead. The reason for him using the name "Eulogio" is not known.

Villegas did not stay long at Botica Antigua. He transferred to a bakery on Calle Página (today Pahina St.). From there he moved on to a circus on its way to Manila. The circus happened to be owned by a katipunero. It was there that he was recruited into the secret society of the Katipunan.

Revolutionary Leadership in Cebu 

During the rebellion against Spain, Villegas led the revolutionaries in Cebu. Initially intending to begin the rebellion on Easter Sunday, he was forced to change his plans when the Spaniards discovered the planned revolt.

Battle of Tres de Abril

3 April 1898, Palm Sunday 

 Villegas and his men began the rebellion in Cebu.

4 April 

 05:00
 The rebels drove the Spanish forces into Fort San Pedro and took control of Cebu City. When the Spanish gunboat María Cristina opened fire, the rebels retreated to the Chinese quarter of Lutao.

7 April 

 500 men of the 73rd Native Regiment and Spanish cazadores with the cruiser Don Juan de Austria arrived under the command of General Texeiro. This forced the rebels to retreat to San Nicolas.

 The Spanish continued pursuing the rebels into the mountain region until 8 April.

Death 

On 8 April 1898, Good Friday, in Carcar, Cebu, Villegas was betrayed and stabbed to death by Captain Florencio Noel, his aide-de-camp Apolinario Alcuitas, and other local townsfolk due to endangering the town of Carcar.

In popular culture
 Portrayed by Ace Espinosa in 1997 episode of ABS-CBN's Bayani in Episodes "Leon Kilat 1898"

References
 3. Pantaleon Villegas https://negrosnowdaily.com/leon-kilat-life-and-heroism/PennT.Larena Retrieved 2022-06-02

External links

1873 births
1898 deaths
19th-century circus performers
Visayan people
Filipino people of Spanish descent
Filipino revolutionaries
Paramilitary Filipinos
People of the Philippine Revolution
People from Negros Oriental
Deaths by stabbing in the Philippines
People from the Spanish East Indies